William Schouler (December 31, 1814 – October 24, 1872) was an American journalist, politician and Adjutant General of Massachusetts during the American Civil War.

Early life
Schouler was born on December 31, 1814, in Kilbarchan, Renfrewshire, Scotland. He immigrated to the United States as a young child. His father had set up a silk print-works establishment on Staten Island and later established a similar business in Arlington, Massachusetts, where Schouler spent most of his childhood.

Journalist and politician
In 1842, Schouler became the owner and editor of the Lowell Courier for the next six years. Also during this time he served as a member of the Massachusetts House of Representatives from Lowell. In 1845, Schouler headed a commission that investigated mill conditions in Lowell and recommended against a proposal to shorten the work day to ten hours. The uproar over Schouler's position led to his defeat in the next election.

Schouler moved to Boston in 1848, where he became part-owner of the Atlas. He also served as a member of the State House from Boston.

Schouler was a delegate at the 1853 Massachusetts State Constitutional Convention, where he expressed the view that corporations were merely devices for people to avoid paying debts.

Later in 1853, Schouler moved to Ohio. He became the editor for the Cincinnati Gazette and later the Ohio State Journal. In 1855 he was appointed Adjutant-General of Ohio by Salmon P. Chase.

Return to Massachusetts and the Civil War
In 1858, Schouler moved back to Boston and in 1860 he was appointed Adjutant General of Massachusetts. In 1861 a Massachusetts militia training camp was named for him, but later renamed for Secretary of War Edwin M. Stanton. He remained Adjutant General throughout all of the U.S. Civil War until 1867. In 1864, Schouler brought attention to Lydia Bixby, a Boston widow who lost several sons in the war; leading President Lincoln to write a moving letter of condolence to her.

Schouler later served one term in the Massachusetts State Senate. He also wrote the two volume History of Massachusetts in the Civil War.

Schouler died on October 24, 1872, at his home near Boston.

See also
 89th Massachusetts General Court (1868)

References

External links

Historical Digression account of William Schouler in the Civil War
New England Historical Society account of Schouler's conflict with Sarah Bagley over mill conditions

History of Massachusetts in the Civil War Vol. I at Internet Archive

1814 births
1872 deaths
Scottish emigrants to the United States
People from Arlington, Massachusetts
Members of the Massachusetts House of Representatives
Massachusetts state senators
19th-century American journalists
Adjutants General of Massachusetts
American male journalists
19th-century American male writers
19th-century American politicians
People from Jamaica Plain